HD 22663 (y Eridani) is a candidate astrometric binary star system in the equatorial constellation of Eridanus. It is visible to the naked eye with an apparent visual magnitude of 4.57. It is moving further away from the Earth with a heliocentric radial velocity of +11.5 km/s, having come within  some 3.76 million years ago.

The visible component is an orange-hued giant star with a stellar classification of K1 III, having exhausted the hydrogen at its core and evolved away from the main sequence. It has an estimated 1.4 times the mass of the Sun and has expanded to 13 times the Sun's radius. At the age of 2.6 billion years, this star is radiating 96 times the Sun's luminosity from its enlarged photosphere at an effective temperature of 4,660 K.

References

K-type giants
Astrometric binaries
Eridanus (constellation)
Eridani, y
Durchmusterung objects
022663
016870
1106